Events from the year 1674 in France.

Incumbents 
Monarch: Louis XIV

Events
 August 11 – Battle of Seneffe: The French army under Louis II de Bourbon, Prince de Condé defeats the Dutch–Spanish–Austrian army under William III of Orange.
 December 4 – Father Jacques Marquette founds a mission on the shores of Lake Michigan to minister to the Illinois Confederation (which will in time grow into the city of Chicago).

Births
 January 15 – Prosper Jolyot de Crébillon, French writer (d. 1762)
 August 2 – Philippe II, Duke of Orléans, regent of France (d. 1723)

Deaths 
 February 22 – Jean Chapelain, French writer (b. 1595)
 March 8 – Charles Sorel, sieur de Souvigny, French writer (b. 1597)
 June 14 – Marin le Roy de Gomberville, French writer (b. 1600)
 August 12 – Philippe de Champaigne, French painter (b. 1602)

See also

References

1670s in France